The 1981–82 North Carolina A&T Aggies men's basketball team represented North Carolina Agricultural and Technical State University during the 1981–82 NCAA Division I men's basketball season. The Aggies, led by third-year head coach Don Corbett, played their home games at the Corbett Sports Center as members of the Mid-Eastern Athletic Conference. They finished the season 19–9, 10–2 in MEAC play to finish in first place. They were champions of the MEAC tournament, winning the championship game over Morgan State, to earn an automatic bid to the 1982 NCAA tournament where they were defeated by West Virginia, 102–72, in the opening round. This marked the first appearance in the NCAA Tournament in program history and started a streak of seven consecutive NCAA Tournament appearances.

Roster

Schedule and results

|-
!colspan=9 style=| Regular season

|-
!colspan=9 style=| 1982 MEAC tournament

|-
!colspan=9 style=|1982 NCAA tournament

Awards and honors
Joe Binion – MEAC Player of the Year

References

North Carolina A&T Aggies men's basketball seasons
North Carolina
North Carolina AandT
North Carolina AandT Aggies men's basketball
North Carolina AandT Aggies men's basketball